is a railway station in Kashima, Saga Prefecture, Japan. It is operated by JR Kyushu and is on the Nagasaki Main Line.

Lines

Station layout 
The station consists of an island platform serving two tracks on an embankment. There is no station building. From the access road, an underpass leads, through the embankment, to the platform. An enclosed shelter has been built over the underpass opening on the platform as a waiting room for passengers. A bike shed is located at the base of the embankment near the entrance to the underpass.

Adjacent stations

History
Japanese Government Railways (JGR) built the station in the 1930s during the development of an alternative route for the Nagasaki Main Line along the coast of the Ariake Sea which was at first known as the Ariake Line. Hizen-Iida was opened on the same day as an intermediate station along the new stretch of track. On 1 December 1934, the entire route was completed and through-traffic achieved from Hizen-Yamaguchi through the station to Nagasaki. The track was then redesignated as part of the Nagasaki Main Line. With the privatization of Japanese National Railways (JNR), the successor of JGR, on 1 April 1987, control of the station passed to JR Kyushu.

Environs
National Route 207

See also
 List of railway stations in Japan

References

External links
Hizen-Iida Station (JR Kyushu)

Railway stations in Saga Prefecture
Nagasaki Main Line
Railway stations in Japan opened in 1934